The Extraordinary and Plenipotentiary Ambassador of Peru to the Republic of South Africa is the official representative of the Republic of Peru to the Republic of South Africa.

The ambassador in South Africa is also accredited to "Sub-Saharan Africa". While this term is not defined, the embassy is explicitly accredited to Mozambique and Zambia.

Both countries established relations in 1994, and have maintained them since. Peru opened an embassy in Pretoria in 1994 and South Africa maintains an embassy in Lima.

List of representatives

See also
List of ambassadors of Peru to Algeria
List of ambassadors of Peru to Egypt
List of ambassadors of Peru to Ghana
List of ambassadors of Peru to Kenya

Notes

References

Peru
South Africa